Thomas Kailath (born June 7, 1935) is an Indian born American electrical engineer, information theorist, control engineer, entrepreneur and the Hitachi America Professor of Engineering, Emeritus, at Stanford University. Professor Kailath has authored several books, including the well-known book Linear Systems, which ranks as one of the most referenced books in the field of linear systems.

Kailath was elected as a member into the US National Academy of Engineering in 1984 for outstanding contributions in prediction, filtering, and signal processing, and for leadership in engineering.

In 2012, Kailath was awarded the National Medal of Science, presented by President Barack Obama in 2014 for "transformative contributions to the fields of information and system science, for distinctive and sustained mentoring of young scholars, and for translation of scientific ideas into entrepreneurial ventures that have had a significant impact on industry."
Kailath is listed as an ISI highly cited researcher and is generally recognized as one of the preeminent figures of twentieth-century electrical engineering.

Biography
Kailath was born in 1935 in Pune, Maharashtra, India, to a Malayalam-speaking Syrian Christian family named Chittoor. His parents hailed from Kerala. He studied at St. Vincent's High School, Pune and received his engineering Bachelor's degree from the Government College of Engineering, the University of Pune in 1956. He received his Master's degree  in 1959 and his doctorate degree in 1961, both from the Massachusetts Institute of Technology (MIT). He was the first Indian-born student to receive a doctorate in electrical engineering from MIT.

Kailath is Hitachi America Professor of Engineering, Emeritus, at Stanford University. Here he has supervised about 80 Ph.D. theses. Kailath's research work has encompassed linear systems, estimation and control theory, signal processing, information theory and semiconductor device fabrication.

Kailath has been an Institute of Electrical and Electronics Engineers (IEEE) Fellow since 1970. He is also a member of the US National Academy of Engineering (NAE), the US National Academy of Sciences (NAS), American Academy of Arts and Sciences (AAAS), the Indian National Academy of Engineering and the Silicon Valley Engineering Hall of Fame.

Kailath was awarded the 2007 IEEE Medal of Honor for "exceptional development of powerful algorithms in the fields of communications, computing, control and signal processing", the 2006 IEEE Jack S. Kilby Signal Processing Medal, and the 1996 IEEE Donald G. Fink Prize Paper Award (together with Ali H. Sayed). In 2017, the Marconi Society honored Kailath with its Lifetime Achievement Award for "his many transformative contributions to information and system science and his sustained mentoring and development of new generations of scientists."

He was awarded the Padma Bhushan award in 2009 by the Government of India for his contribution to Science and Engineering.

He has been awarded with the 2009 BBVA Foundation Frontiers of Knowledge Award in Information and Communication Technology for break the miniaturization barrier of chips.

Kailath received praise from Dr. Patrick Dewilde, the Director of Delft Institute of Microelectronics and Submicron Technology at Delft University in the Netherlands.

He was married to Sarah Kailath from 1962 until her death in 2008, with whom he had four children: Ann (wife of MIT professor George Verghese), Paul, Priya and Ryan.

In 2013, Kailath married Dr. Anuradha Luther Maitra, retired economics professor, Trustee and former President of the UC Santa Cruz Foundation Board, and former CEO of Floreat, Inc.

Kailath is also the brother-in-law of journalist T. J. S. George, who is also a recipient of the Padma Bhushan.

Kailath has co founded several high technology companies, including Integrated Systems (founded in 1980 and merged with WindRiver Systems in 1999), Numerical Technologies (founded in 1995 and acquired by Synopsys), and Excess Bandwidth Corporation (founded in 1998 and acquired by Virata Corporation in 2000, which itself merged with Globespan in 2001 and now Conexant).

He was selected by President Barack Obama for the National Medal of Science along with other prominent scientists for "invaluable contributions to their fields and help[ing] improve countless lives."
He was elected to the 2018 class of fellows of the American Mathematical Society.

Publications
 1979, Linear Systems (Prentice-Hall Information and System Science Series) (1979, Prentice Hall)
 1987, Indefinite-Quadratic Estimation and Control: A Unified Approach to H2 and H Theories (Studies in Applied and Numerical Mathematics) with Ali H. Sayed & Babak Hassibi (1987, Society for Industrial & Applied Mathematics)
 1997, Discrete Neural Computation: A Theoretical Foundation with Kai-Yeung Siu & Vwani Roychowdhury (1997, Prentice Hall)
 2000, Linear Estimation with Ali H. Sayed & Babak Hassibi (2000, Prentice Hall)

References

External links

Kailath' Stanford website
Stanford biography
IEEE Spectrum article
IEEE 2007 Medal of Honor: Thomas Kailath
IEEE History Center: Thomas Kailath oral history from IEEE
Sarah Kailath Chair in India Studies
Indolink piece on Dr. Kailath, mentions malayalam script on his house

American computer scientists
Control theorists
1935 births
Living people
Fellows of the Society for Industrial and Applied Mathematics
Fellows of the American Mathematical Society
Members of the United States National Academy of Engineering
Members of the United States National Academy of Sciences
Fellow Members of the IEEE
IEEE Medal of Honor recipients
Recipients of the Padma Bhushan in science & engineering
Foreign Members of the Royal Society
Foreign Fellows of the Indian National Science Academy
Stanford University School of Engineering faculty
MIT School of Engineering alumni
Savitribai Phule Pune University alumni
American people of Malayali descent
Indian emigrants to the United States
20th-century American engineers
21st-century American engineers
American academics of Indian descent
20th-century Indian engineers
21st-century Indian engineers
Scientists from Pune
Engineers from Maharashtra
Detection and estimation theorists